Corizus hyoscyami is a species of scentless plant bug belonging to the family Rhopalidae, subfamily Rhopalinae. It is commonly called the cinnamon bug or black and red squash bug.

Subspecies
 Corizus hyoscyami hyoscyami (Linnaeus, 1758) 
 Corizus hyoscyami nigridorsum (Puton, 1874)

Distribution
Corizus hyoscyami subs. hyoscyami is found in most of Europe; in Britain, the species appears to be spreading northwards, having been recorded in Yorkshire. Corizus hyoscyami subs. nigridorsum is present in Spain, Italy, Morocco and Tunisia.

Description
Like all scentless plant bugs, it lacks well-developed scent glands and can be distinguished by numerous veins in the membrane of the hemelytra, characteristic of all members of the Rhopalidae.

In Corizus hyoscyami subs. hyoscyami the third and fourth abdominal tergites are red, while in Corizus hyoscyami subs. nigridorsum they are completely black. The dorsum colours are visible in elitrale transparency under the membrane.

Although striking in colour, Corizus hyoscyami may be confused with the similarly marked but unrelated  Pyrrhocoris apterus (firebug) (see comparison).

Comparison of Pyrrhocoris and Corizus

Biology
Adults can be found all year around. This species overwinters as an adult. The new generation appears in August–September.

Adult: All year

References

Sources

External links
Corizus hyoscyami on Essex Field Club
Biolib

Hemiptera of Europe
Bugs described in 1758
Taxa named by Carl Linnaeus
Rhopalini